The Market towns of Sør-Trøndelag and Nord-Trøndelag counties was an electoral district for parliamentary elections in Norway. It comprised the market towns of Trondheim in Sør-Trøndelag county and Levanger in Nord-Trøndelag county.

The district was established ahead of the 1921 Norwegian parliamentary election following the change from single member constituencies to plural member constituencies in 1919.

Following changes in the national policy on market towns in 1952, these electoral districts were abolished ahead of the 1953 Norwegian parliamentary election. Instead, each county became one electoral district, and for election purposes the towns were integrated into their respective counties.

Representatives
The following representatives were elected from the Market towns of Sør-Trøndelag and Nord-Trøndelag counties:

Legend:

NKP = Communist Party, Norges Kommunistiske Parti
A = Labour Party, Det Norske Arbeiderparti
SDA = Social Democratic Labour Party, Norges Socialdemokratiske Arbeiderparti
RF = Radical People's Party (Worker Democrats), Det Radikale Folkeparti (Arbeiderdemokratene)
KrF = Christian Democratic Party, Kristelig Folkeparti
B = Farmers' Party, Bondepartiet
V = Liberal Party, Venstre
FV = Liberal Left Party, Frisinnede Venstre
H = Conservative Party, Høyre

References
Parliamentary representatives - Norwegian Parliament official site

Sor-Trondelag and Nord-Trondelag
1921 establishments in Norway
1953 disestablishments in Norway